North End is a hamlet at the northern end of the parish of Great Waltham in the Chelmsford district of Essex, England.

Black Chapel Cottage, a former priest's house, is a Grade II* listed building. It was repaired in about 1950 after wartime bomb damage.

The Prodigy singer Keith Flint was a resident of North End from 1997 until his death in 2019.

References

External links

Hamlets in Essex
Great Waltham